"Dirty Little Secret" is a song by American rock band the All-American Rejects from their second studio album Move Along. It was released on June 6, 2005, as the lead single from the album.

Background
"Dirty Little Secret" was written by Nick Wheeler and Tyson Ritter, who claimed that because they were both at the time in long-term relationships with their girlfriends they had to "concoct some histrionics". Wheeler said "We come from a small town, and until now we've both had steady relationships. So, you know, sometimes there's not enough drama or turmoil to write about, so he simply writes stories. And that's where the lyrics come from."

"'Dirty Little Secret' was just an acoustic guitar and a vocal, that's all it was," Wheeler said. "We put off getting the full band in and coming up with the arrangement until the very last second. We were literally less than a week away from going into the studio, and we all started jamming and tossing out ideas. We had the arrangement down within an hour and that was that. We ended up recording it and couldn't get the motherfucking thing out of our heads."

Reception

Critical reception
The song received generally positive reviews from music critics. Contactmusic.com stated "Give this cheeky little track three listens, and it's got you. You'll be singing along at festivals all summer with a huge grin on your face. There may indeed be laws in some countries about having hooks this large and frequent during one song", while About.com said "'Dirty Little Secret' is catchy and amiable, but it's little more than that. The title seems chosen for intrigue, but it promises much more than it delivers. The song is ultimately a rather ordinary treatise on carrying on a secret relationship."

ClickMusic reviewed with "There's nothing exciting about this. It seems such a tired format, a group of guys in their early 20s peddling teenage angst like they were A. It's upbeat, rocky with a typically catchy, if corny, chorus, yet this really seems like one for the fan base only." Music OMH stated "If Simple Plan are a poor man's Green Day, The All-American Rejects are a poor man's Simple Plan. It's fluffy punk pop for middle class American teenage girls who don't want to listen to Ciara and 50 Cent, and would rather get sweaty with boys in eyeliner than shake their booty to the latest Missy Elliott remix."

Chart performance
"Dirty Little Secret" first charted in the United States on July 30, 2005, and became the band's first top 10 track on the Billboard Hot 100; peaking at number nine in January 2006. The song also climbed to the top spot of Billboard's Hot Digital Songs after a total of 26 weeks and later peaked at number 48 on Billboard's "Year-End Hot 100 Singles of 2006".

In the United Kingdom, "Dirty Little Secret" was originally released on October 24, 2005, but charted poorly at number 96 on the UK Singles Chart. It was re-released in June 2006 following the success of the band's second single "Move Along" and gave the All-American Rejects their second top-20 hit in the UK.

Music video

The music video for "Dirty Little Secret" was directed by Marcos Siega. It was filmed in May 2005 in Dorney Park & Wildwater Kingdom in Allentown, Pennsylvania and various other Allentown locations and was released a month later in mid-June. It features a montage of various people holding up postcards sharing "dirty little secrets" while the band performs the song in an abandoned warehouse with the cards enlarged and displayed behind them in a backdrop.

The postcards in the video were posted by anonymous people onto the website PostSecret, a project where users can create their own cards; sharing their darkest secrets and posting them to the website without giving their name or any other details. The idea came from director Marcos Siega when searching for inspiration for the video. He performed an internet search of the word "secrets" and came across the PostSecret website. The All-American Rejects agreed with Siega's idea and paid the website to use some of their postcards for the video, with the money going towards The Kristin Brooks Hope Center, a non-profit organization that funds a suicide hotline. After the release of the music video, the band sold the postcards featured on eBay with the proceeds also going towards the Hope Center.

Awards

Track listings

Charts

Weekly charts

Year-ends charts

Certifications

Release history

References

External link
"Dirty Little Secret", official music video on YouTube

2005 singles
The All-American Rejects songs
Culture of Allentown, Pennsylvania
Song recordings produced by Howard Benson
Music videos directed by Marcos Siega
2005 songs
Songs written by Tyson Ritter
Songs written by Nick Wheeler
Interscope Records singles
Songs containing the I–V-vi-IV progression